Blind Massage is a 2014 drama film directed by Lou Ye and based on the 2008 novel Massage by Bi Feiyu.

Cast
Guo Xiaodong
Qin Hao
Zhang Lei
Mei Ting
Huang Xuan
Huang Lu
Wang Zhihua
Huang Junjun
Jiang Dan
Mu Huaipeng

Reception
The film entered into the competition for the Golden Bear at the 64th Berlin International Film Festival. and won Silver Bear award for Outstanding Artistic Contribution.  It received seven nominations at the 51st Golden Horse Film Awards, and won six, namely Best Feature Film, Best New Performer, Best Adapted Screenplay, Best Cinematography, Best Film Editing and Best Sound Effects.

It has grossed ¥7.68 million at the Chinese box office.

References

External links

2014 films
Chinese drama films
French drama films
2010s Mandarin-language films
Films based on Chinese novels
Films directed by Lou Ye
Films set in Nanjing
Films shot in Nanjing
Silver Bear for outstanding artistic contribution
Asian Film Award for Best Film winners
Films about blind people
2014 drama films
2010s French films